Ann Mortimer  (born in Toronto, Canada) is a Canadian ceramic artist. In 2000 Mortimer was appointed a member of the Order of Canada.

References

Further reading

1934 births
Canadian women artists
Members of the Order of Canada
Living people
Canadian ceramists
Members of the Royal Canadian Academy of Arts